Sesieutes is a genus of Asian liocranid sac spiders first described by Eugène Simon in 1897. It was briefly transferred to the Corinnidae in 2013, but was returned a year later due to its similarity and relation to Phrurolithus.

Species
 it contains thirteen species:
Sesieutes aberrans Dankittipakul & Deeleman-Reinhold, 2013 – Thailand
Sesieutes abruptus Dankittipakul & Deeleman-Reinhold, 2013 – Malaysia
Sesieutes apiculatus Dankittipakul & Deeleman-Reinhold, 2013 – Indonesia
Sesieutes bifidus Dankittipakul & Deeleman-Reinhold, 2013 – Malaysia
Sesieutes borneensis Deeleman-Reinhold, 2001 – Borneo, Sulawesi, Philippines
Sesieutes bulbosus Deeleman-Reinhold, 2001 – Borneo
Sesieutes emancipatus Deeleman-Reinhold, 2001 – Malaysia
Sesieutes longyangensis Zhao & Peng, 2013 – China
Sesieutes lucens Simon, 1897 (type) – Malaysia, Singapore
Sesieutes minor Deeleman-Reinhold, 2001 – Borneo
Sesieutes minuatus Dankittipakul & Deeleman-Reinhold, 2013 – Thailand
Sesieutes nitens Deeleman-Reinhold, 2001 – Indonesia (Java, Sumatra)
Sesieutes scrobiculatus Deeleman-Reinhold, 2001 – Indonesia (Sumatra)

References

Araneomorphae genera
Liocranidae
Spiders of Asia
Taxa named by Eugène Simon